The Private Higher School of Engineering and Technology or ESPRIT, is a private engineering school in Tunisia based in Ariana and accredited by the Ministry of Higher Education and Scientific Research (approval N°2003-03).

Diplomas 
ESPRIT offers several specialties and courses:
 Preparatory cycle for engineering studies    
 Computer engineering
 Telecommunications engineering     
 Civil engineering    
 Electromechanical engineering     
 Management science

References

External links 
 

Universities in Tunisia
2003 establishments in Tunisia